Chisocheton is a genus of trees in the family Meliaceae. The genus name comes from the Greek  and  meaning "split tunic", referring to the lobed staminal tube of C. patens. Their range is from India and tropical China, throughout Malesia and south to New South Wales and Vanuatu.

Description
Chisocheton is typically dioecious. Flowers are usually unisexual, rarely bisexual, with a cup-shaped calyx. Fruits are one or two-seeded. Chisocheton habitats are rain forests, typically understorey trees, from sea-level to about  altitude.

The wood of several Chisocheton species is used locally in light construction. In the Philippines, the seeds of Chisocheton cumingianus (known locally as balukanag) are used to make a non-drying oil either for traditional medicine or as fuel for oil lamps.

Leaf indeterminacy 
Unlike nearly all other seed plants, the leaves of Chisocheton have indeterminate growth - they never stop growing. Instead of forming a terminal leaflet, they form a small leaf-tip bud, which produces new leaflets continuously.

This trait is shared with a few closely related genera, such as Guarea.

Species
 The Plant List recognises 53 accepted species (including infraspecific names):

 Chisocheton aenigmaticus  
 Chisocheton amabilis  
 Chisocheton cauliflorus  
 Chisocheton celebicus  
 Chisocheton ceramicus  
 Chisocheton crustularii  
 Chisocheton cumingianus  
 subsp. balansae  
 subsp. kinabaluensis  
 Chisocheton curranii  
 Chisocheton diversifolius  
 Chisocheton dysoxylifolius  
 Chisocheton erythrocarpus  
 Chisocheton gliroides  
 Chisocheton granatum  
 Chisocheton grandiflorus  
 Chisocheton koordersii  
 Chisocheton lansiifolius  
 Chisocheton laosensis  
 Chisocheton lasiocarpus  
 Chisocheton lasiogynus  
 Chisocheton longistipitatus  
 Chisocheton macranthus  
 Chisocheton macrophyllus  
 Chisocheton maxilla-pisticis  
 Chisocheton medusae  
 Chisocheton mendozai  
 Chisocheton montanus  
 Chisocheton novobritannicus  
 Chisocheton patens  
 Chisocheton pauciflorus  
 Chisocheton pellegrinianus  
 Chisocheton penduliflorus  
 Chisocheton pentandrus  
 subsp. paucijugus  
 Chisocheton perakensis  
 Chisocheton pilosus  
 Chisocheton pohlianus  
 Chisocheton polyandrus  
 Chisocheton rex  
 Chisocheton ruber  
 Chisocheton sapindinus  
 Chisocheton sarasinorum  
 Chisocheton sarawakanus  
 Chisocheton sayeri  
 Chisocheton schoddei  
 Chisocheton setosus  
 Chisocheton stellatus  
 Chisocheton tenuis  
 Chisocheton tomentosus  
 Chisocheton velutinus  
 Chisocheton vindictae  
 Chisocheton warburgii

References

External links

 
Meliaceae genera
Dioecious plants